New Port is a north-western suburb of Adelaide.

It was created in 2007 from parts of the suburbs of Birkenhead,  Ethelton, Glanville and Semaphore Park. The name "Newport Quays" had been requested but this was not supported by the relevant government authority.   Because there is limited access to the suburb due to it being located between the Port River and the Outer Harbor railway line, the relevant Minister of the Crown considered the views of emergency service organisations before creating the new suburb.   On 6 August 2009, its eastern boundary was extended in part to the centre-line of the Port River.

The historic Fletcher's Slip Precinct at 230-246 Semaphore Road is listed on the South Australian Heritage Register.

The 2016 Australian census which was conducted in August 2016 reports that New Port had 677 people living within its boundaries.

New Port is located in the federal division of Hindmarsh, the state electoral district of Port Adelaide   and the local government area of the City of Port Adelaide Enfield.

References

Suburbs of Adelaide
Lefevre Peninsula